A Central Executive Committee is a governing body with executive power in parties, governments, or private organizations. The term may refer to one of the following:

General 
 Central Executive Committee (PAP), the highest ruling committee within Singapore's People's Action Party (PAP) 
 Central Executive Committee (Philippines), an insurgent revolutionary government established by Francisco Macabulos in 1898
 Central Executive Committee of the Pakistan Peoples Party

Former Soviet Union 
 Central Executive Committee of the Soviet Union (1922-1938)
 All-Russian Central Executive Committee (1917-1937)
 All-Ukrainian Central Executive Committee (1917-1938)
 All-Byelorussian Central Executive Committee (1920–1938)
 All-Caucasian Central Executive Committee (1922–1936)
 Litbel Central Executive Committee (1919–1920)
 Centrosibir, name for the Central Executive Committee of Soviets of Siberia (1917)
 Rumcherod, name for the Central Executive Committee of Soviets of Romanian Front, Black See Fleet, and Odessa Oblast (1917–1918)
 Central Executive Committee of the Navy (June-November 1917)

See also
 Executive Committee (disambiguation)
 National Executive Committee (disambiguation)
 :Category:Executive committees of political parties
 
 Central committee
 Politburo